The following is a list of notable deaths in February 2017.

Entries for each day are listed alphabetically by surname. A typical entry lists information in the following sequence:
 Name, age, country of citizenship at birth, subsequent country of citizenship (if applicable), reason for notability, cause of death (if known), and reference.

February 2017

1
E. Ahamed, 78, Indian politician, Minister of External Affairs (2004–2014), heart attack.
Anne Arrasmith, 70, American artist and curator.
Keith Barber, 72–73, British geographer.
Asim Basu, 81, Indian theatre director, lung infection.
David Peter Battaglia, 86, American politician, member of the Minnesota House of Representatives (1977–1995).
Lars-Erik Berenett, 74, Swedish actor (Jordskott, Skilda världar).
Albano Bortoletto Cavallin, 86, Brazilian Roman Catholic prelate, Bishop of Guarapuava (1986–1992) and Archbishop of Londrina (1992–2006), surgical complications.
Mark Brownson, 41, American baseball player (Colorado Rockies).
Desmond Carrington, 90, British actor (Emergency – Ward 10) and broadcaster.
Robert Dahlqvist, 40, Swedish rock singer and guitarist (The Hellacopters, Dundertåget), drowning as a result of a seizure.
Constantin Dinulescu, 85, Romanian footballer (AS Progresul București).
Sandy Gandhi, 59, Indian-born Australian comedian.
Stig Grybe, 88, Swedish actor (Charlie Strapp and Froggy Ball Flying High).
*Cor van der Hoeven, 95, Dutch footballer (Ajax).
William Melvin Kelley, 79, American novelist, complications from kidney failure.
Basilio Lami Dozo, 88, Argentine military officer.
Carter Manny, 98, American architect.
Sir Ken Morrison, 85, British businessman, president of Morrisons.
Oskar A. Munch, 88, Norwegian businessman (ABB Group).
Bernardine Portenski, 67, New Zealand long-distance runner, ovarian cancer.
Alma Redlinger, 92, Romanian painter.
Edward Tipper, 95, American World War II veteran (Easy Company), depicted in Band of Brothers.
Étienne Tshisekedi, 84, Congolese politician, Prime Minister (1991, 1992–1993, 1997), pulmonary embolism.
Antoon Verschoot, 91, Belgian bugler.
Esther K. Walling, 76, American politician, member of the Wisconsin State Assembly (1983–1989), cancer.
A. N. Yiannopoulos, 88, Greek-born American legal academic.

2
Gordon Aikman, 31, British ALS campaigner, amyotrophic lateral sclerosis.
José Antonio Alonso, 56, Spanish politician, Minister of the Interior (2004–2006) and Defence (2006–2008), lung cancer.
Alvin Baldus, 90, American politician, member of the U.S. House of Representatives from Wisconsin's 3rd congressional district (1975–1981) and the Wisconsin State Assembly (1966–1975, 1989–1997).
Angelo Bissessarsingh, 34, Trinidadian historian and author, pancreatic cancer.
Tom Drake, 86, American wrestler and politician, member of the Alabama House of Representatives (1960–1992), Speaker (1983–1987).
John Hilton, 74, American football player (Pittsburgh Steelers, Detroit Lions), fall.
Bertram Kostant, 88, American mathematician.
Max Lüscher, 93, Swiss psychotherapist.
George Maderos, 83, American football player (San Francisco 49ers).
Predrag Matvejević, 84, Bosnian-Croatian writer and literature professor.
Peter McArthur, 79, Australian politician, member of the Victorian Legislative Assembly for Ringwood (1976–1982).
Perry McGriff, 79, American football player and politician, member of the Florida House of Representatives (2000–2002).
Shunichiro Okano, 85, Japanese football player, manager (national team) and sports executive, lung cancer.
Miltos Papapostolou, 81, Greek football player and manager (AEK Athens, national team).
Ruan Posheng, 100, Chinese politician, member of the National People's Congress (1979–1988).
Jeff Sauer, 73, American ice hockey coach (Wisconsin Badgers), pancreatic cancer.
Seymour Jonathan Singer, 92, American cell biologist.
Su Hongjun, 76, Chinese astronomer.
Gonzalo Taboada, 88, Spanish Olympic bobsledder (1956).

3
Dritëro Agolli, 85, Albanian writer, pulmonary disease.
Zoya Bulgakova, 102, Russian actress.
Earl H. Carroll, 91, American federal judge, U.S. District Court for the District of Arizona (1980–1994).
Carmelo Cassati, 92, Italian Roman Catholic prelate, Archbishop of Trani-Barletta-Bisceglie (1990–1999).
Marjorie Corcoran, 66, American particle physicist, traffic collision.
Anthony French, 96, British-American physicist, contributor to the Manhattan Project.
Joseph Green, 82, American academic and theatre producer.
Joe Grima, 80, Maltese politician and broadcaster (Radio Malta).
Yoshiro Hayashi, 89, Japanese politician, Minister of Finance (1992–1993), multiple organ failure.
John M. Hayes, 76, American geochemist, pulmonary fibrosis.
Roy Heenan, 81, Canadian lawyer and academic, founder of Heenan Blaikie.
Colin Hutton, 90, English rugby league player (Widnes, Hull F.C.), manager and executive (Hull Kingston Rovers).
Hassan Joharchi, 48, Iranian actor, liver disease.
Marisa Letícia Lula da Silva, 66, Brazilian trade unionist, First Lady (2003–2010), stroke.
Richard Lyon, 93, American admiral and politician, Mayor of Oceanside, California (1992–2000).
Shumon Miura, 91, Japanese Third Generation author, pneumonia.
Benny Perrin, 57, American football player (St. Louis Cardinals), suicide by gunshot.
Lou Rowan, 91, Australian Test cricket umpire.
Lorenzo Servitje, 98, Mexican businessman and philanthropist, co-founder of Grupo Bimbo.
Martin Gotthard Schneider, 86, German theologian, cantor and church music composer.
Bob Stewart, 66, Canadian ice hockey player (California Golden Seals, St. Louis Blues).
Don Trousdell, 79, American artist.
Michael Whinney, 86, British Anglican prelate, Bishop of Southwell (1985–1988).

4
Neil Betts, 90, Australian rugby union player (Queensland, Wallabies).
Antonio Casale, 84, Italian actor (The Good, the Bad and the Ugly, Le salamandre).
Gervase de Peyer, 90, British clarinetist.
García de Andoin, 83, Spanish football player and manager.
John Gay, 92, American screenwriter (Run Silent, Run Deep, Separate Tables).
Basil Hetzel, 94, Australian medical researcher, iodine deficiency campaigner.
Hans van der Hoek, 83, Dutch footballer (Feyenoord).
John Howes, 92, American professor of Asian studies.
Steve Lang, 67, Canadian bass guitarist (April Wine), complications from Parkinson's disease.
Margaret Mungherera, 59, Ugandan physician, President of the World Medical Association (2013–2014), cancer.
Sir Kenneth Newman, 90, British police officer, Commissioner of the Metropolitan Police (1982–1987).
*Ivor Noël Hume, 89, British archaeologist (Wolstenholme Towne).
David Phillips, 60, American cinematographer (The Basketball Diaries, Saturday Night Live).
Tim Piazza, 19, American student, injuries sustained in a hazing.
Bano Qudsia, 88, Pakistani writer (Raja Gidh).
Noel Simms, 82, Jamaican reggae percussionist and singer, lung cancer.
Marc Spitz, 47, American writer (We Got the Neutron Bomb, Bowie: A Biography) and music journalist (Spin).
Georgy Taratorkin, 72, Russian stage and film actor.
Yang Shiming, 92, Chinese thermodynamicist.

5
Irma Adelman, 86, Romanian-born American economist.
Rahila Al Riyami, Omani politician.
García de Andoin, 83, Spanish football player and manager (Espanyol).
David Axelrod, 85, American arranger, composer and producer, lung cancer.
Ron Billingsley, 71, American football player (San Diego Chargers, Houston Oilers).
Ray Christensen, 92, American sportscaster (WCCO), upper respiratory infection.
Betty Collette, 86, American veterinary pathologist.
Glen Dudbridge, 78–79, British sinologist.
Sonny Geraci, 70, American singer (The Outsiders, Climax).
Gila Goldstein, 69, Italian-born Israeli actress, singer and transgender rights activist, stroke.
Luis Gómez-Montejano, 94, Spanish football executive, President of Real Madrid (2006).
Björn Granath, 70, Swedish actor (Madicken, Pelle the Conqueror, The American).
Carroll Izard, 93, American psychologist.
Kálmán Katona, 69, Hungarian politician.
Thomas Lux, 70, American poet, lung cancer.
Gopalkrishna P. Nayak, 89, Indian writer.
James Sankowski, 67, American ceramic artist.
Suranjit Sengupta, 71, Bangladeshi politician, MP (since 1979).
Harry Sullivan, 84, Australian VFL footballer (Carlton, Collingwood).

6
Ivar Aronsson, 88, Swedish rower, Olympic silver medalist (1956).
Boy Asistio, 80, Filipino politician, Mayor of Caloocan (1980–1986, 1988–1995).
Len Bosman, 93, Australian politician, member of the Australian House of Representatives for St George (1963–1969).
Bill Britton, 82, Canadian football player (BC Lions, Calgary Stampeders).
Irwin Corey, 102, American comedian (The Steve Allen Show) and actor.
David Culver, 92, Canadian businessman (Alcan).
Christine Dolce, 35, American model, liver failure.
Marc Drogin, 80, American writer and illustrator.
Raymond Clare Edwards, 96, Canadian politician.
José Gea Escolano, 87, Spanish Roman Catholic prelate, Bishop of Ibiza (1976–1987) and Mondoñedo-Ferrol (1987–2005).
Neil Gehrels, 64, American astronomer, pancreatic cancer.
Stan Jones, 67, American politician, member of the Indiana House of Representatives (1974–1990).
Inge Keller, 93, German actress (The Last Year, Aimée & Jaguar, Lola and Billy the Kid).
Djelloul Khatib, 80, Algerian independence activist and politician.
Alec McCowen, 91, English actor (A Night to Remember, Frenzy, Gangs of New York).
Frances Prince, 79, American politician.
Ted Proud, 86, British postal historian.
Vacys Reimeris, 95, Lithuanian poet.
Luis Santamarina, 74, Spanish Olympic bicycle racer (1964) .
Roy Forge Smith, 87, British production designer (Monty Python and the Holy Grail, Ghost Whisperer, Teenage Mutant Ninja Turtles).
Raymond Smullyan, 97, American mathematician and philosopher.
Deborah Lynn Steinberg, 55, American-British academic, author, educator and sociologist, breast cancer.
Albert Stubblebine, 87, American major general.
Roger Walkowiak, 89, French racing cyclist, Tour de France winner (1956).
Joost van der Westhuizen, 45, South African rugby union player (Bulls, Blue Bulls, national team), motor neuron disease.
Ritchie Yorke, 73, Australian music journalist, chronic obstructive pulmonary disease.

7
Svend Asmussen, 100, Danish jazz violinist.
Matt Baker, 61, American horse trainer and jockey.
Pat Beard, 69, American politician, member of the Minnesota House of Representatives (1983–1994), complications from exposure to Agent Orange.
Valeriu Bularca, 85, Romanian wrestler, Olympic silver medalist (1964).
Andrew Davison, 37, American football player (New York Jets, Dallas Cowboys).
Sotsha Dlamini, 76, Swazi politician, Prime Minister (1986–1989), fall.
Smail Hamdani, 86, Algerian politician, Prime Minister (1998–1999).
Richard Hatch, 71, American actor (Battlestar Galactica, The Streets of San Francisco, All My Children), pancreatic cancer.
Michael Henshall, 88, British Anglican prelate, Bishop of Warrington (1976–1996).
Huang Mulan, 110, Chinese secret agent.
Loukianos Kilaidonis, 73, Greek singer-songwriter, respiratory infection.
Martti Laitinen, 87, Finnish footballer.
Sidney H. Liebson, 96, American scientist.
Luis Alberto Luna Tobar, 93, Ecuadorian Roman Catholic prelate, Archbishop of Cuenca (1981–2000).
Norah McClintock, 59, Canadian author, ovarian cancer.
Miho Nakayama, 78, Japanese comedian.
Nilawan Pintong, 101, Thai writer.
Gianfranco Plenizio, 76, Italian composer and conductor (Hotel Rwanda).
Antonín Přidal, 81, Czech writer and translator.
Hans Rosling, 68, Swedish academic, professor of International Health and co-founder of the Gapminder Foundation, pancreatic cancer.
John Salt, 75, British Anglican bishop, Diocese of St Helena (1999–2011).
Tzvetan Todorov, 77, Bulgarian-French philosopher.
Richard B. Wright, 79, Canadian novelist (Clara Callan).

8
Ljubiša Beara, 77, Bosnian military officer and convicted war criminal.
Timothy Behrens, 79, British painter.
Alvin C. Bush, 93, American politician.
Viktor Chanov, 57, Ukrainian footballer, beaten.
Richard DuFour, 69, American educational researcher, cancer.
Georges El-Murr, 86, Lebanese-born Jordanian Melkite Catholic hierarch, Archbishop of Petra and Philadelphia (1992–2007) and Patriarchal Exarch of Iraq (1997–2004).
Giorgio Giacomelli, 87, Italian diplomat.
Kjell Heggelund, 84, Norwegian writer and editor.
Arthur Hyman, 95, American academic.
Sir Elihu Lauterpacht, 88, British lawyer.
Sir Peter Mansfield, 83, English physicist, laureate of the Nobel Prize in Physiology or Medicine (2003).
Rina Matsuno, 18, Japanese pop singer (Shiritsu Ebisu Chugaku), lethal arrhythmia.
Brendan McGahon, 80, Irish politician, TD (1982–2002).
Patrick Mumbure Mutume, 73, Zimbabwean Roman Catholic prelate, Auxiliary Bishop of Mutare (since 1979).
Mohamud Muse Hersi, Somali politician, 79–80, President of Puntland (2005–2009).
Ólöf Nordal, 50, Icelandic politician, Minister of the Interior (2014–2017), cancer.
Tara Palmer-Tomkinson, 45, British socialite and television presenter, perforated ulcer and peritonitis.
José Luis Pérez de Arteaga, 66, Spanish music critic, musicologist and journalist.
Tom Raworth, 78, British poet and publisher.
Tony Särkkä, 44, Swedish multi-instrumentalist (Abruptum, Ophthalamia).
Alan Simpson, 87, British comedy scriptwriter (Hancock's Half Hour, Comedy Playhouse, Steptoe and Son), lung disease.
Steve Sumner, 61, English-born New Zealand footballer (Christchurch United, Manurewa, national team), prostate cancer.
Mikhail Tolstykh, 36, Ukrainian DPR separatist commander (War in Donbass), rocket launcher explosion.
Yoshio Tsuchiya, 89, Japanese actor (Seven Samurai, The Human Vapor, Funeral Parade of Roses).
Jan Vansina, 87, Belgian historian and professor (University of Wisconsin–Madison).
Sir John Wells, 91, British politician, MP (1959–1987), complications from a fall.

9
Serge Baguet, 47, Belgian racing cyclist, colon cancer.
Walter Brasch, 71, American journalist.
Donald Leslie Brothers, 93, Canadian politician, member of the Legislative Assembly of British Columbia (1958–1972).
*Chen Hsing-ling, 92, Taiwanese military officer, head of the Air Force and Armed Forces.
Marcel Dandeneau, 85, American politician, member of the Wisconsin State Assembly (1975–1979), cancer.
Radu Gabrea, 79, Romanian film director (Călătoria lui Gruber) and screenwriter.
Claude Geffré, 91, French Roman Catholic theologian.
Barbara Gelb, 91, American biographer, playwright and journalist.
Kenneth Harrap, 85, British biochemist.
Piet Keizer, 73, Dutch footballer (Ajax, national team), lung cancer.
Josefina Leiner, 88, Mexican actress.
Packy, 54, American-born Asian elephant, euthanized.
Simon Porter, 66, English cricket player and administrator (Oxfordshire).
André Salvat, 96, French Army colonel.
Warren Unna, 93, American journalist (The Washington Post), congestive heart failure.

10
Wiesław Adamski, 69, Polish sculptor, stroke.
Roger Boas, 95, American politician, Chief Administrative Officer of San Francisco (1977-1986).
Albert Boscov, 87, American businessman (Boscov's), pancreatic cancer.
Edward Bryant, 71, American science fiction and horror writer.
Miles Cahn, 95, American businessman, co-founder of Coach, Inc.
H. R. Crawford, 78, American real estate developer and politician, prostate cancer.
Peter Farrer, 90, English author and cross-dresser.
Maxine Grimm, 102, American religious figure (Latter-day Saints).
Larry Hickman, 81, American football player (Hamilton Tiger-Cats, Green Bay Packers).
Max Hooper, 82, English naturalist.
Mike Ilitch, 87, American businessman (Little Caesars, Detroit Red Wings, Detroit Tigers).
Dahlov Ipcar, 99, American painter and author.
Piet Keizer, 73, Dutch footballer (AFC Ajax).
Ben Martin, 86, American photographer, complications from pulmonary fibrosis.
Hal Moore, 94, American lieutenant general and author (We Were Soldiers Once… And Young).
Yuriy Poyarkov, 80, Ukrainian volleyball player, Olympic champion (1964, 1968).
Royal Delta, 9, American racehorse, foaling complications.
Bob Sweetan, 76, Canadian professional wrestler.
Charles Truman, 67, British art historian.
*Wang Lin, 64, Chinese qigong master, multiple organ failure.
Tsuyoshi Yamanaka, 78, Japanese swimmer, Olympic silver medalist (1956, 1960), pneumonia.

11
Danièle Djamila Amrane-Minne, 77, French-Algerian political activist, academic and writer.
Bruno A. Boley, 92, Italian-born American engineer.
Joseph Bonnar, 68, English rugby league player.
Jeremy Geathers, 30, American arena football player (Spokane Shock, Orlando Predators), traffic collision.
Chavo Guerrero Sr., 68, American professional wrestler (NWA, AWA, WWE), liver cancer.
Eivind Hjelmtveit, 90, Norwegian cultural administrator (Riksteatret, Oslo Kino).
Knut Kleve, 90, Norwegian philologist.
Vasily Kudinov, 47, Russian handball player, Olympic champion (1992, 2000).
Allan Juel Larsen, 85, Danish Olympic cyclist.
Howard Leeds, 97, Canadian-born American television producer and writer (The Brady Bunch, Silver Spoons, Diff'rent Strokes).
Harvey Lichtenstein, 87, American arts administrator (Brooklyn Academy of Music), complications from a stroke.
Kurt Marti, 96, Swiss poet and theologian.
Fab Melo, 26, Brazilian basketball player (Boston Celtics).
M. Mike Miller, 87, American travel writer and politician, member of the Alaska House of Representatives (1971–1987).
Piet Rentmeester, 78, Dutch racing cyclist.
Jaap Rijks, 97, Dutch Olympic equestrian (1948).
Jarmila Šuláková, 87, Czech folk singer.
Jiro Taniguchi, 69, Japanese manga artist (A Distant Neighborhood).
Juan Ulloa, 82, Costa Rican footballer (Alajuelense, national team).
Jozef Zlatňanský, 89, Slovak Roman Catholic prelate, Titular Bishop of Mons Faliscus (since 1997) and Secretary of ICCEE (1997–2004).

12
Dave Adolph, 79, American football coach (Cleveland Browns, San Diego Chargers, Los Angeles Raiders), cancer.
Sam Arday, 71, Ghanaian football coach (national team).
Herminio Bautista, 82, Filipino actor and director (Bagets), member of Quezon City Council (1988–1991).
Jay Bontatibus, 52, American actor (The Young and the Restless, General Hospital), cancer.
Stacy Bromberg, 60, American woman darts player, world champion (2010), cancer.
Barbara Carroll, 92, American jazz pianist.
Sara Coward, 69, British actress (The Archers), breast cancer.
Damian, 52, British pop singer, cancer.
Nancy Diamond, 75, Canadian politician, Mayor of Oshawa, Ontario (1991–2003).
Åsleik Engmark, 51, Norwegian actor and comedian.
Hector Fautario, 92, Argentine Air Force officer.
Al Jarreau, 76, American jazz and R&B singer ("Moonlighting", "Since I Fell for You", "We Are the World"), seven-time Grammy winner, respiratory failure.
Hamida Khuhro, 80, Pakistani politician, writer, professor and historian.
Sione Lauaki, 35, Tongan-born New Zealand rugby union player (Chiefs, New Zealand national team), kidney failure.
Yitzhak Livni, 82, Israeli media executive and writer.
Alice Ludes, 104, American singer.
Albert Malbois, 101, French Roman Catholic prelate, Bishop of Évry-Corbeil-Essonnes (1966–1977).
Anna Marguerite McCann, 83, American archaeologist and art historian.
Quentin Moses, 33, American football player (Miami Dolphins, Arizona Cardinals), house fire.
Bobby Murdoch, 81, English footballer (Liverpool).
Giusto Pio, 91, Italian violinist and songwriter ("I treni di Tozeur").
Ren Xinmin, 101, Chinese rocket scientist.
Clint Roberts, 82, American politician, member of the U.S. House of Representatives from South Dakota's 2nd congressional district (1981–1983), COPD.
David Seals, 69, American author and screenwriter (Powwow Highway).
Krystyna Sienkiewicz, 81, Polish actress and singer.

13
Ricardo Arias Calderón, 83, Panamanian politician, Vice President (1990–1992).
Aage Birch, 90, Danish sailor, Olympic silver medalist (1968).
Edward E. David Jr., 92, American electrical engineer, Director of the White House Office of Science and Technology (1970–1973).
Melvin Defleur, 93, American mass communications scholar.
Harold Denton, 80, American public servant, Director of the Office of Nuclear Reactor Regulation.
Raymond Dugrand, 92, French geographer.
E-Dubble, 34, American rap artist, infection.
Mostafa El-Abbadi, 88, Egyptian historian, heart failure.
Fame and Glory, 11, Irish racehorse, winner of the Irish Derby and Ascot Gold Cup, heart attack.
Paulo Henrique Filho, 52, Brazilian footballer.
Jan Grabowski, 66, Polish speedway rider.
Aileen Hernandez, 90, American union organizer and women's rights activist, President of the National Organization for Women (1970–1971).
Gerald Hirschfeld, 95, American cinematographer (Young Frankenstein, Fail Safe).
Giorgos Ioannou, 90, Greek artist.
Kim Jong-nam, 45, North Korean political figure, member of Kim dynasty, poisoned.
Bruce Lansbury, 87, British-American television producer (Murder, She Wrote, The Wild Wild West, Knight Rider) and screenwriter, complications from Alzheimer's disease.
Lucky Pulpit, 16, American racehorse, heart attack.
John Rote, 88, American hockey player.
J. Glenn Schneider, 81, American educator and politician.
Salma Siddiqui, 85, Indian novelist.
Darrell K. Smith, 55, American football player (Toronto Argonauts), cancer.
Momo Wandel Soumah, 39, Guinean footballer.
Seijun Suzuki, 93, Japanese director and screenwriter.
Satya Pal Wahi, 88, Indian corporate executive (Oil and Natural Gas Corporation).
Rebecca Welles, 89, American actress.

14
Anne Aaserud, 74, Norwegian art historian.
Mikhail Agranovich, 86, Russian mathematician.
B. B. Bhattacharya, 71, Indian economist and professor, cardiac arrest.
Cipriano Chemello, 71, Italian racing cyclist, Olympic bronze medalist (1968).
Adrien Duvillard, 82, French Olympic skier (1956, 1960).
Siegfried Herrmann, 84, German Olympic long-distance runner (1956, 1964).
Ríkharður Jónsson, 87, Icelandic footballer.
Jiří Lanský, 83, Czech Olympic high jumper (1960), European championship silver medalist (1954, 1958).
Elisabeth Lichtenberger, 91, Austrian geographer.
Molly Mahood, 97, British literary scholar.
Joseph Neal, 66, American politician, member of the South Carolina House of Representatives (since 1993).
Paul Nguyên Van Hòa, 85, Vietnamese Roman Catholic prelate, Bishop of Phan Thiết (1975) and Nha Trang (1975–2009).
Deanna Summers, 76, American songwriter ("Goodbye Priscilla (Bye Bye Baby Blue)").
Odd Tandberg, 92, Norwegian painter.
Hans Trass, 88, Estonian botanist.
*Casimir Wang Mi-lu, 74, Chinese clandestine Roman Catholic prelate, Bishop of Qinzhou (1981–2003).
John Watkinson, 84, New Zealand soil chemist.
George Herbert Weiss, 86, American mathematician.
Walter Wheeler, 91, American politician.

15
Infante Henrique, Duke of Coimbra, 67, Portuguese royal.
Rich Ingold, 53, American arena football player and coach (Washington Commandos, Quad City Steamwheelers, Wilkes-Barre/Scranton Pioneers).
Manfred Kaiser, 88, German football player and manager (Wismut Gera).
Margareta Kjellin, 68, Swedish politician, MP (since 2006), lung cancer.
Olavi Luoto, 90, Finnish Olympian.
Stuart McLean, 68, Canadian radio broadcaster (The Vinyl Cafe), melanoma.
Michèle McQuigg, 69, American politician, member of the Virginia House of Delegates (1998–2008).
Roy Proverbs, 84, English footballer (Gillingham).
Gelek Rimpoche, 77, Tibetan-born American Buddhist teacher.
José Solé, 87, Mexican stage actor and director.
Tadeusz Swietochowski, 84, Polish-American historian.
Loren Wiseman, 65, American game designer (Game Designers' Workshop), heart attack.

16
Cordelia Agbebaku, 55, Nigerian academic administrator.
Josef Augusta, 70, Czech ice hockey player and coach, Olympic silver medalist (1976), pancreatic cancer.
William Beck, 87, American Olympic skier.
Dick Bruna, 89, Dutch author and illustrator (Miffy).
Les Cocker, 77, English footballer (Wolverhampton).
Teresa del Conde, 82, Mexican art historian and critic.
Norman Thomas di Giovanni, 83, American editor and translator.
Ross Greenberg, 60, American journalist and antivirus pioneer, pneumonia and multiple sclerosis.
Bengt Gustavsson, 89, Swedish football player and manager.
Hamish Hardie, 88, British Olympic sailor.
Isahak Isahakyan, 83, Armenian banker, chairman of the Central Bank (1986–1994).
Jannis Kounellis, 80, Greek-Italian artist.
Elsa Marston, 83, American author.
Osmond P. Martin, 86, Belizean Roman Catholic Prelate, Bishop of Belize City-Belmopan (1983–2006).
Dimitris Mytaras, 83, Greek painter.
Pericoma Okoye, 81–82, Nigerian singer.
Ali Osman, 58–59, Sudanese composer and conductor.
Richard Pankhurst, 89, British academic.
Peter Richardson, 85, English cricketer (Worcestershire, Kent, national team).
Krishnaraj Sriram, 43, Indian cricketer, cardiac arrest.
George Steele, 79, American professional wrestler (WWF) and actor (Ed Wood), renal failure.
Jerome Tuccille, 80, American writer and activist.
*Wang Ben-hu, 63, Taiwanese television presenter, cancer.
Duke Washington, 83, American football player (Philadelphia Eagles), pneumonia.
Ep Wieldraaijer, 89, Dutch politician, member of House of Representatives (1963–1974).

17
Alan Aldridge, 73, British graphic designer (The Who, Elton John).
Charles L. Bartlett, 95, American journalist (Chattanooga Times), Pulitzer Prize winner (1956), heart ailment.
Evangelos Basiakos, 63, Greek politician, MP (since 1989), heart attack.
Nicole Bass, 52, American bodybuilder and professional wrestler (WWF, ECW, XPW), stroke.
David Braine, 76, British philosopher.
Helmut Brenner, 60, Austrian musicologist.
P. Michael Conneally, 85, American geneticist.
Lars Engberg, 74, Danish politician, Lord Mayor of Copenhagen (2004–2005).
Tore Eriksson, 79, Swedish biathlete, Olympic bronze medalist (1968).
Just Faaland, 95, Norwegian economist.
Warren Frost, 91, American actor (Twin Peaks, Matlock, Seinfeld).
Börge Hellström, 59, Swedish writer (Roslund/Hellström), cancer.
Tomislav Ivančić, 78, Croatian Roman Catholic theologian and academic.
Cecil J. Kempf, 89, American military officer, Chief of United States Navy Reserve (1983–1987).
Emmanuelle Khanh, 79, French stylist and fashion designer, pancreatic cancer.
Kim Ji-young, 78, South Korean actress (Silenced, Arahan, Too Beautiful to Lie).
Louis Quatorze, 24, American thoroughbred racehorse and sire, heart attack.
Theodore J. Lowi, 85, American political scientist.
Robert H. Michel, 93, American politician, U.S Representative from Illinois's 18th district (1957–1995), pneumonia.
Leonard Myers, 38, American football player (New England Patriots), cancer.
Isarapong Noonpakdee, 83, Thai army officer, Commander of the Royal Thai Army (1992).
Michael Novak, 83, American Roman Catholic theologian, complications from colon cancer.
Russ Prior, 67, Canadian Olympic weightlifter (1976), world championship bronze medalist (1976).
Tom Regan, 78, American philosopher and animal rights advocate, pneumonia.
Andrew Schneider, 74, American journalist (Pittsburgh Press, Seattle Post-Intelligencer), Pulitzer Prize winner (1986, 1987), heart failure.
Hank Searls, 94, American author and screenwriter.
Ved Prakash Sharma, 61, Indian writer, lung cancer.
Peter Skellern, 69, English singer-songwriter, brain cancer.
Niki Stajković, 57, Austrian Olympic diver (1972,1976,1980,1988,1992), European championship silver medalist (1987), heart failure.
James Stevenson, 87, American illustrator and author.
Su Qiang, 85, Chinese inorganic chemist.
Thomas Sweeney, 87, Australian rugby union player.
Michael Tuchner, 82, British film and theatre director.
Marko Veselica, 81, Croatian politician, economist and convicted dissident.
Tony Vinson, 81, Australian social scientist.
Sir Nicholas Wall, 71, English judge, President of the Family Division (2010–2012).
Magnus Wenninger, 97, American mathematician and author.

18
Omar Abdel-Rahman, 78, Egyptian Muslim leader and convicted terrorist.
Victor Arbekov, 74, Russian motocross racer, world champion (1965).
Jambuwantrao Dhote, 77, Indian politician, cardiac arrest.
Nick Dupree, 34, American disability rights activist, sepsis and cardiac failure.
Lyla Elliott, 82, Australian politician, member of the Western Australian Legislative Council (1971–1986), cancer.
Gene Hatfield, 91, American artist.
Roger Hynd, 75, Scottish football player (Rangers, Birmingham City) and manager (Motherwell).
Kris Kaspersky, 40, Russian computer security researcher, injuries sustained in skydiving accident.
Ivan Koloff, 74, Canadian professional wrestler (WWF, NWA), liver cancer.
Erland Kops, 80, Danish badminton player, European championship silver medalist (1970).
Tom Larson, 69, American politician, member of the Wisconsin State Assembly (2011–2016), lung cancer.
Norma McCorvey, 69, American political activist, plaintiff in U.S. Supreme Court case Roe v. Wade.
Henk Nienhuis, 75, Dutch football player and manager (Veendam).
Sir Michael Ogio, 74, Papua New Guinean politician, Governor-General (since 2010).
Nadiya Olizarenko, 63, Ukrainian track athlete, Olympic champion (1980).
Samuel Poyntz, 90, Irish prelate, Bishop of Connor (1987–1995).
John Ross, 90, Austrian-born American chemist.
Richard Schickel, 84, American film critic (Time), complications from a series of strokes.
Lawrence F. Snowden, 95, American military officer.
Pasquale Squitieri, 78, Italian film director and screenwriter.
Clyde Stubblefield, 73, American drummer (James Brown), kidney failure.
Sulamani, 17, Irish racehorse, euthanized.
Alan Thompson, 92, British academic and politician, MP for Dunfermline Burghs (1959–1964).
Dan Vickerman, 37, South African-born Australian rugby union footballer (Brumbies, Waratahs, national team), suicide.
Carmen Delgado Votaw, 81, Puerto Rican civil rights activist.

19
Alejandro Atchugarry, 64, Uruguayan lawyer and politician, Minister of Economy and Finance (2002–2003), aneurysm.
Shibaji Banerjee, 60s, Indian footballer (Mohun Bagan), heart attack.
Xavier Beulin, 58, French agribusiness executive (Avril), heart attack.
Charismatic, 20, American racehorse, winner of the 1999 Kentucky Derby and the 1999 Preakness Stakes, pelvic hemorrhage.
Richard J. Coffee, 92, American politician, Chairman of the New Jersey Democratic State Committee (1977–1981).
Larry Coryell, 73, American jazz guitarist, heart failure.
Don Dixon, Baron Dixon, 87, British politician, MP for Jarrow (1979–1997).
Dean Ehlers, 87, American college basketball coach (Memphis, James Madison).
Kaci Kullmann Five, 65, Norwegian politician, Storting (1981–1997) and Chairwoman of the Norwegian Nobel Committee (since 2015), breast cancer.
Anthony Forbes, 79, British stockbroker (Cazenove).
Karla M. Gray, 69, American state judge, Associate Justice (1991–2000) and Chief Justice (2001–2008) of the Montana Supreme Court, cancer.
Darryl Hammond, 49, American arena football player (St. Louis Stampede, Nashville Kats, Georgia Force), amyotrophic lateral sclerosis.
Kyoko Hayashi, 86, Japanese author.
Altamas Kabir, 68, Indian judge, Chief Justice (2012–2013).
Hillar Kärner, 81, Estonian chess player.
Jørgen Kieler, 97, Danish physician and World War II resistance member.
Harry MacPherson, 90, American baseball player (Boston Braves).
Halaevalu Mataʻaho ʻAhomeʻe, 90, Tongan royal, Queen Consort (1965–2006), Queen Mother (since 2006).
Paul McCarthy, 45, Irish footballer (Wycombe Wanderers, Brighton & Hove Albion).
Igor Shafarevich, 93, Ukrainian-born Russian mathematician.
Saadi Simawe, 70, Iraqi-born American author.
Renate Simson, 82, American scholar of African-American literature.
Danuta Szaflarska, 102, Polish actress.
Bob White, 81, Canadian trade unionist.
Chris Wiggins, 86, English-born Canadian voice actor (Babar, Friday the 13th: The Series, The Best Damn Fiddler from Calabogie to Kaladar).
Nancy Willard, 80, American writer.
John S. Wold, 100, American politician, U.S. House of Representatives from Wyoming's at-large congressional district (1969–1971).
Marilyn B. Young, 79, American historian.
Roman Zhuravskyi, 68, Ukrainian footballer (Dynamo Kyiv, Karpaty Lviv).

20
Benjamin F. Bailar, 82, American civil servant, Postmaster General (1975–1978).
Ilene Berns, 73, American record executive (Bang Records).
George L. Blackburn, 81, American surgeon, clinician, researcher and author.
Jaroslava Blažková, 83, Slovak writer.
Brenda Buttner, 55, American news correspondent (Fox News), cancer.
Vitaly Churkin, 64, Russian diplomat, Permanent Representative to the United Nations (since 2006), Ambassador to Belgium (1994–1998) and child actor (A Mother's Heart), heart failure.
Timothy A. Cohn, 59, American hydrologist, mantle cell lymphoma.
Mildred Dresselhaus, 86, American nanotechnologist.
José Fernandes Fafe, 90, Portuguese diplomat and writer.
Jamie Fox, 62, American politician and political strategist, New Jersey Commissioner of Transportation (2014–2015), heart failure.
Steve Hewlett, 58, British journalist (The Guardian) and radio presenter (The Media Show), oesophageal cancer.
Huang Feili, 99, Chinese musician and conductor.
Sofía Ímber, 92, Romanian-born Venezuelan journalist.
Antony Mitradas, 103, Indian film director.
Fenton Mole, 91, American baseball player (New York Yankees).
Leo Murphy, 78, Northern Irish Gaelic footballer.
Cyril Pavlov, 97, Russian religious leader (Russian Orthodox Church).
Eric Smith, 97, Australian artist.
Suthan Suthersan, 60, Sri Lankan-born American environmental engineer.
André Vlayen, 85, Belgian racing cyclist.

21
Max Angus, 102, Australian painter.
Kenneth Arrow, 95, American economist, Nobel Prize laureate (1972).
Brunella Bovo, 84, Italian actress (Miracle in Milan, The White Sheik).
Regina Branner, 85, Austrian Olympic athlete.
Enzo Carella, 65, Italian singer-songwriter.
Jeanne Martin Cissé, 90, Guinean teacher and politician.
Douglas Coe, 88, American evangelical leader.
Desmond Connell, 90, Irish Roman Catholic cardinal, Archbishop of Dublin (1988–2004).
Ion Croitoru, 53, Canadian professional wrestler (SMW, AWA, WWF) and convicted criminal.
Frank Delaney, 74, Irish author and journalist.
Jamal Udeen Al-Harith, 50, British terrorist, suicide bombing. (death announced on this date)
Sir Cosmo Haskard, 100, Irish-born British colonial administrator, Governor of the Falkland Islands (1964–1970).
Joy Hruby, 89, Australian actress (Brides of Christ) and television presenter.
Jean-Pierre Jorris, 91, French stage actor.
Salome Karwah, 28, Liberian nurse and ebola survivor, co-Time Person of the Year (2014), complications from childbirth.
Edwin Kessler, 88, American atmospheric scientist.
Long John, 6, American bucking bull.
Sir Michael Palmer, 88, British Army officer, Defence Services Secretary (1982–1985).
Graciela Paraskevaidis, 76, Argentine writer and composer.
Ruth L. Ratny, 89, American journalist and screenwriter, heart failure.
David Rhoads, 84, American Olympian.
Garel Rhys, 76, British economist and motor industry academic.
Setrak Sarkissian, 80–81, Lebanese tabla player.
Stanisław Skrowaczewski, 93, Polish-American conductor and composer.

22
David Bárcena Ríos, 75, Mexican Olympic pentathlete (1964, 1968), equestrian (1972, 1976), and bronze medallist (1980).
Ronald Blackwood, 91, Jamaican-born American politician, Mayor of Mount Vernon, New York (1985–1996), first elected black mayor in New York state, Parkinson's disease.
Kim Chance, 70, Australian politician and farmer, member of the Western Australian Legislative Council (1992–2009).
Gordon Gray Currie, 93, Canadian politician, member of the Legislative Assembly of Saskatchewan (1982–1986).
Ricardo Domínguez, 31, Mexican welterweight boxer, colon cancer.
Eni Faleomavaega, 73, American Samoan politician and attorney, Delegate to the U.S. House of Representatives (1989–2015), Lieutenant Governor (1985–1989).
Sir John Fieldsend, 95, British Zimbabwean judge.
Trevor D. Ford, 91, British geologist.
Ed Garvey, 76, American labor attorney, NFLPA executive director and counsel (1970–1983).
J. Karl Hedrick, 72, American mechanical engineer, lung cancer.
Clifford Kinvig, 82, British military historian.
Fritz Koenig, 92, German sculptor, creator of The Sphere at the World Trade Center.
Nikos Koundouros, 90, Greek film director (O Drakos).
Roberto Lamarca, 57, Venezuelan actor (Por estas calles), pulmonary illness.
Marcus Leyrer, 87, Austrian Olympic fencer (1964).
Ralph A. Loveys, 87, American politician, member of the New Jersey General Assembly (1983–1989).
John McCormack, 91, Canadian ice hockey player (Toronto Maple Leafs, Montreal Canadiens).
Dag Østerberg, 78, Norwegian sociologist, philosopher and musicologist.
Aleksei Petrenko, 78, Ukrainian-born Russian actor (Agony, World War II: Behind Closed Doors).
Stephen Rhodes, 66, Irish radio presenter (BBC Three Counties Radio), motor neurone disease.
George Weedon, 96, British Olympic gymnast (1948, 1952).
Bill Woodson, 99, American voice actor (This Is Your FBI, Super Friends).

23
Antonio Borghesi, 67, Italian politician.
Ward Chamberlin, 95, American public broadcasting executive (WETA), dementia.
Alan Colmes, 66, American political commentator (Fox News), lymphoma.
Don Cousens, 78, Canadian politician, Ontario MPP (1981–1994), Mayor of Markham, Ontario.
Bernie Custis, 88, American CFL player (Hamilton Tiger-Cats, Ottawa Rough Riders), member of the Canadian Football Hall of Fame.
Bengt Fahlström, 78, Swedish journalist and television presenter, pneumonia.
Vic Fair, 78, British graphic designer.
Charles M. Herzfeld, 91, Austrian-born American scientist.
Alfonso de Jesús Hinojosa Berrones, 92, Mexican Roman Catholic prelate, Bishop of Ciudad Victoria (1974–1985).
Derek Ibbotson, 84, British runner, Olympic bronze medalist (1956).
David Keightley, 84, American sinologist.
Armin Medosch, 54, Austrian arts journalist, cancer.
Maurice Mewis, 87, Belgian Olympic wrestler.
Yashpal Mohanty, 38, Indian cricketer.
Sabine Oberhauser, 53, Austrian physician and politician, Minister of Health (since 2014) and Women's Affairs (since 2016), abdominal cancer.
Horace Parlan, 86, American-born Danish jazz pianist.
Óscar Salas Moya, 80, Bolivian politician and trade unionist, complications from pulmonary fibrosis.
Ivo Svoboda, 68, Czech politician, Finance Minister (1998–1999).
Richard Tilghman, 97, American politician.
David Waddington, Baron Waddington, 87, British politician, Home Secretary (1989–1990), Leader of the House of Lords (1990–1992), Governor of Bermuda (1992–1997).
Leon Ware, 77, American musician, record producer, and songwriter ("I Want You", "I Wanna Be Where You Are"), complications from prostate cancer.
Zander Wedderburn, 81, British psychologist.

24
Faye Glenn Abdellah, 97, American nursing researcher and admiral.
Aldona Aleškevičienė-Statulevičienė, 81, Lithuanian mathematician.  
Araldo Cossutta, 92, American architect.
Daryl, 61, American magician, suicide by hanging.
Carl Lodewijk Ebeling, 93, Dutch linguist.
Nderitu Gachagua, 63, Kenyan politician, Governor of Nyeri County (since 2013), pancreatic cancer.
Ronald T. Halverson, 80, American religious leader (LDS Church) and politician.
Fumio Karashima, 68, Japanese jazz pianist, cancer.
Lee Tsuntung, 100, Chinese Olympic basketball player (1948).
Gustaw Lutkiewicz, 92, Polish actor (A Year of the Quiet Sun).
Leigh Markopoulos, 48, German-born American art critic and curator.
Fred Oldfield, 98, American painter.
Vito Ortelli, 95, Italian racing cyclist.
Ren Hang, 29, Chinese photographer, suicide.
Tom Ryan, 92, Australian football player.
Miriam Tlali, 83, South African author.
Xie Xuejin, 93, Chinese geochemist.

25
Hassan Al-Jundi, 78, Moroccan author, playwright and actor (The Message).
Abdullah Balak, 79, Turkish composer.
Hassan Daaboul, Syrian general, head of military intelligence, bombing.
Neil Fingleton, 36, English basketball player, actor and stuntman (Game of Thrones, 47 Ronin, Avengers: Age of Ultron), heart failure.
Shifa Zikri Ibrahim, 30, Iraqi journalist (Rudaw), bombing.
Jan Hoem, 77, Norwegian demographer.
Scott Lew, 48, American screenwriter (Sexy Evil Genius, Bickford Shmeckler's Cool Ideas), amyotrophic lateral sclerosis.
Bobby Lumley, 84, English footballer (Hartlepool United, Charlton Athletic).
Eric Miller, 75, American record producer (Pablo Records), heart attack.
Carlos Miloc, 85, Uruguayan football coach (Tigres UANL).
Toshio Nakanishi, 61, Japanese musician (Plastics), esophageal cancer.
Elli Norkett, 20, Welsh rugby player (national team), traffic collision.
Bill Paxton, 61, American actor (Apollo 13, Titanic, Big Love), stroke as a complication from heart surgery.
Don Payne, 84, American jazz bassist.
Chez Pazienza, 47, American journalist, author and television producer.
Jack Pope, 103, American judge, attorney and author, Chief Justice of the Texas Supreme Court (1982–1985).
Dorothy P. Rice, 94, American economist, complications from a fall.
Boaz Vaadia, 65, Israeli-born American sculptor, pancreatic cancer.
Lloyd Williams, 83, Welsh rugby player (Cardiff, national team).

26
Abu Khayr al-Masri, 59, Egyptian deputy leader of al-Qaeda, drone strike.
Katalin Berek, 86, Hungarian actress (Adoption).
Cabral, 16, Polish-born British dressage horse, Paralympic gold winner (2012), euthanized.
Jay Cronley, 73, American writer (Tulsa World).
Ludvig Faddeev, 82, Russian theoretical physicist and mathematician (Faddeev equations, Faddeev-Popov ghost).
Guðjón Finnbogason, 89, Icelandic footballer 
L. R. Ford Jr., 89, American mathematician.
Eugene Garfield, 91, American linguist.
Ned Garver, 91, American baseball pitcher (St. Louis Browns, Detroit Tigers, Kansas City Athletics).
Sunny Hale, 48, American polo player, complications from breast cancer.
Preben Hertoft, 89, Danish sexologist.
Louis S. Kahnweiler, 97, American property developer.
Aristides Kalantzakis, 89, Greek politician, Minister of Labor (1990–1993), Minister of Trade (1980–1981).
Sir Gerald Kaufman, 86, British politician, MP for Manchester Ardwick (1970–1983) and Manchester Gorton (since 1983), Father of the House (since 2015).
Stephen Lodge, 74, American screenwriter.
Jean-Paul Martin-du-Gard, 89, French Olympic runner (1952, 1956).
Essa Moosa, 81, South African judge and anti-apartheid activist.
Abdul Salam, 48–49, Afghan Taliban-recognized Governor of Kunduz, drone strike.
Mushi Santappa, 93, Indian chemist.
Irvine Sellar, 82, English property developer (The Shard).
Ray Stokes, 92, Australian footballer.
Joseph Wapner, 97, American judge (Los Angeles County Superior Court) and television personality (The People's Court, Judge Wapner's Animal Court), respiratory failure.

27
Lyn Barnett, New Zealand-born Australian pop singer. (body discovered on this date)
Zvjezdan Cvetković, 56, Croatian football player and manager.
Marcel De Corte, 87, Belgian footballer (Anderlecht, national team).
John Harlan, 91, American radio and television personality (Password, Name That Tune).
Arvo Krikmann, 77, Estonian folklorist and academic.
Liu Zemin, 72, Chinese politician.
Syd Lowdon, 81, English rugby league player (Whitehaven, Workington Town, Cumberland).
Peter Mathews, 65, Irish politician, TD (2011–2016), oesophageal cancer.
Eigil Nansen, 85, Norwegian human rights activist.
Carlos Humberto Romero, 92, Salvadoran politician, President (1977–1979).
P. Shiv Shankar, 87, Indian politician, Governor of Sikkim (1994–1995) and Kerala (1995–1996).
*Sin Kek Tong, 72, Singaporean politician, founder of the Singapore People's Party.
Sam Summerlin, 89, American foreign correspondent (Associated Press), complications from Parkinson's disease.
Jórunn Viðar, 98, Icelandic pianist and composer.
Alex Young, 80, Scottish footballer (Hearts, Everton, national team).
Eva Maria Zuk, 71, Polish-born Mexican pianist.

28
Yuri Abramovich, 81, Ukrainian-born Russian test pilot.
A. Welford Castleman Jr., 81, American physicist and chemist.
Walker Connor, 90, American political scientist.
Simeon Datumanong, 81, Filipino politician.
Donald Easten, 98, British Army officer, recipient of the Military Cross.
Leone di Lernia, 78, Italian radio host, singer and composer, liver cancer.
Peter Feil, 69, Swedish Olympic swimmer (1968).
Daphne Lorraine Gum, 101, Australian educator.
Spencer Hays, 80, American art collector.
Jarle Høysæter, 83, Norwegian television journalist.
Marian Javits, 92, American arts patron.
Paul Kangas, 79, American broadcaster (Nightly Business Report), complications from Parkinson's disease and prostate cancer.
Gabriel Konertz, 62, German Olympic rower (1976).
Carl Adam Lewenhaupt, 69, Swedish count.
Ric Marlow, 91, American songwriter ("A Taste of Honey") and actor (Bonanza, Magnum, P.I., Hawaii Five-O).
James McGrath, 85, Canadian politician, Lieutenant Governor of Newfoundland and Labrador (1986–1991), MP (1957–1963, 1968–1986).
Douglas Milmine, 95, British Anglican prelate, Bishop of Paraguay (1973–1985).
Nicholas Mosley, 93, British novelist and biographer.
Joseph A. Panuska, 89, American educator, President of the University of Scranton (1982–1998).
Claude Pascal, 96, French composer.
Pierre Pascau, 78, Mauritian-Canadian journalist.
Vladimir Petrov, 69, Russian ice hockey player, Olympic champion (1972, 1976) and silver medalist (1980).
Antônio Ribeiro de Oliveira, 90, Brazilian Roman Catholic prelate, Bishop of Ipameri (1975–1985) and Archbishop of Goiânia (1985–2002).
Dave Rosenfield, 87, American baseball manager (Norfolk Tides).
Haji Abdul Salam, 69, Indian politician.
Elisabeth Waldheim, 94, Austrian political figure, First Lady (1986–1992).
James Walker, 76, British actor (Nineteen Eighty-Four, Empire of the Sun).
William Wightman, 87, Canadian politician.

References

2017-02
 02